Osso may refer to:

 Alessandro Osso  (born 1987), Italian footballer
 Osso, Virginia, unincorporated community in King George County, Virginia, United States of America